In the first edition of the tournament, Martin Damm and Karel Nováček won the title by defeating Gary Muller and Piet Norval 6–4, 1–6, 6–3 in the final.

Seeds

Draw

Draw

References

External links
 Official results archive (ATP)
 Official results archive (ITF)

Singles
Ostrava Open